Thaumastus is a genus of tropical air-breathing land snails, terrestrial pulmonate gastropod mollusks in the family Megaspiridae.

Distribution 
The distribution of the genus Thaumastus includes Colombia, Peru, Ecuador, ...

Species 
Species within the genus Thaumastus include:
 Thaumastus ascendens (L. Pfeiffer, 1853)
 Thaumastus blanfordianus (Ancey, 1903)
 Thaumastus buckleyi (Higgins, 1872)
 Thaumastus contortuplicatus (Reeve, 1850)
 Thaumastus crenellus (Philippi, 1867)
 Thaumastus dukinfieldi (Melvill, 1900)
 Thaumastus flori (Jousseaume, 1897)
 Thaumastus foveolatus (Reeve, 1849)
 Thaumastus glyptocephalus (Pilsbry, 1897)
 Thaumastus granocinctus (Pilsbry, 1901)
 Thaumastus hartwegi (Pfeiffer, 1846) - type species of the genus Thaumastus
 Thaumastus hebes Strebel, 1910
 Thaumastus hyalinus (J. A. Wagner, 1827)
 Thaumastus inca (d'Orbigny, 1835)
 Thaumastus indentatus (Da Costa, 1901)
 Thaumastus insolitus (Preston, 1909)
 Thaumastus integer (Pfeiffer, 1855)
 Thaumastus largillierti (Philippi, 1845)
 Thaumastus loxostomus (Pfeiffer, 1853)
 Thaumastus magnificus (Grateloup, 1840)
 Thaumastus melanocheilus (Nyst, 1845)
 Thaumastus nehringi (E. von Martens, 1889)
 Thaumastus occidentalis Weyrauch, 1960
 Thaumastus orcesi Weyrauch, 1967
 Thaumastus orobaenus (d'Orbigny, 1835)
 † Thaumastus patagonicus Parodiz, 1946 
 Thaumastus plumbeus (L. Pfeiffer, 1855)
 Thaumastus requieni (L. Pfeiffer, 1853)
 Thaumastus robertsi Pilsbry, 1932
 Thaumastus sangoae (Tschudi, 1852)
 Thaumastus sarcochrous (Pilsbry, 1897) - type species of the subgenus Thaumastiella
 Thaumastus straubei Colley, 2012
 Thaumastus sumaqwayqu Breure & Mogollón, 2016
 Thaumastus tatutor (Jousseaume, 1887)
 Thaumastus taunaisii (Férussac, 1822)

Synonyms
 Thaumastus alausiensis Cousin, 1887: synonym of Bostryx alausiensis (Cousin, 1887)
 Thaumastus brunneus Strebel, 1910: synonym of Thaumastus inca (d'Orbigny, 1835) (junior synonymy)
 Thaumastus cadwaladeri Pilsbry, 1930: synonym of Kara cadwaladeri (Pilsbry, 1930) (original combination)
 Thaumastus jelskii (Lubomirski, 1880): synonym of Scholvienia jelskii (Lubomirski, 1880)
 Thaumastus juana Cousin, 1887: synonym of Bostryx juana (Cousin, 1887) (original combination)
 † Thaumastus limnaeiformis (Meek & Hayden, 1857): synonym of † Lioplacodes limneaformis (Meek & Hayden, 1856)  (incorrect subsequent spelling; new combination)
 Thaumastus nystianus (L. Pfeiffer, 1853): synonym of Drymaeus nystianus (L. Pfeiffer, 1853) (unaccepted > superseded combination)
 Thaumastus spixii (J. A. Wagner, 1827): synonym of Thaumastus hyalinus (J. A. Wagner, 1827) (combination based on a mix-up of original names )
 Thaumastus thompsonoides Oberwimmer, 1931: synonym of Kara thompsonii (L. Pfeiffer, 1845) (junior subjective synonym)
 Thaumastus weyrauch Pilsbry, 1944: synonym of Scholvienia weyrauchi (Pilsbry, 1944) (incorrect original spelling)

 Subgenus Thaumastus (Atahualpa) : synonym of Thaumastus E. von Martens, 1860 (junior synonymy)
 Subgenus Thaumastus (Kara) Strebel, 1910: synonym of Kara Strebel, 1910
 Subgenus Thaumastus (Quechua) Strebel, 1910: synonym ofs Quechua Strebel, 1910 (unaccepted rank)
 Subgenus Thaumastus (Scholvienia) Strebel, 1910: elevated to rank of genus Scholvienia Strebel, 1910
 Thaumastus bitaeniatus (Nyst, 1845) - synonym: Bulimus bitaeniatus Nyst, 1845 - type species of the subgenus Scholvienia
 Thaumastus jaspideus (Morelet, 1863)
 Subgenus Thaumastus (Thaumastiella) Weyrauch, 1956: synonym of Thaumastus E. von Martens, 1860
 Subgenus Thaumastus (Thaumastus) E. von Martens, 1860: synonym of Thaumastus E. von Martens, 1860
 Subgenus Paeniscutalus Wurtz, 1947: elevated to the rank of genus Paeniscutalus Wurtz, 1947

See also 
 Kara was a subgenus of Thaumastus and Kara was elevated to its genus level in 2011.

References

External links 
 

Megaspiridae